The Antonianum, also known as the Pontifical University of Saint Anthony, and as Pontifical Athenaeum Antonianum, is a Franciscan pontifical university in Rome named in honour of Anthony of Padua. It is located in the Rione Esquiline, a block north of the Basilica of St John Lateran, at Via Merulana 124, near the intersection of Via Labicana/Viale Manzoni and Via Merulana.

History

In 1883, Father Bernardino Dal Vago da Portogruaro (1869–1889), Minister General of the Order of Friars Minor, proposed the construction of a new academic college:

Construction of the university began in 1884 and the institution was opened 6 years later in 1890 by Luigi Canali (1889–1897).

To obtain legal recognition from the Italian state, the university was founded as a Missionary College attached to the Roman Curia and the Propaganda Fide. Though this allowed the university to open and operate, missionary work was not the original aim of the university and its academic leaders were keen to secure recognition for the institution in its own right. The process was delayed first by World War I and then by the publication, by Pope Pius XI, of the Deus Scientiarum Dominus, which dictated new rules for academic study. Finally, on 17 May 1933, the Congregation of Seminaries and Universities issued a decree granting the university the right to issue academic qualifications.

In 1926 the college inaugurated a philosophical-theological review entitled Antoniarum.

On 14 June 1938, the institution was granted the right to use the title Pontifical by Pope Pius XI. On 11 January 2005, Pope John Paul II granted the University the right to use the Pontifical University title.

Faculties

The University has four faculties and a number of associated institutes, which run approximately 180 courses per year:
 Faculty of Theology
 Faculty of Biblical Sciences and Archaeology (Studium Biblicum Franciscanum in Jerusalem)
 Faculty of Canon Law
 Faculty of Philosophy

The University also includes the Franciscan Institute of Spirituality, operated by the Order of Friars Minor Capuchin.

References

External links 
 Official website

1933 establishments in Italy
Educational institutions established in 1933
Antonianum
Catholic universities and colleges in Italy
Universities and colleges in Rome
Franciscan universities and colleges